Samuel George Davis Jr. (December 8, 1925 – May 16, 1990) was an American singer, dancer, actor, comedian, film producer and television director.

At age three, Davis began his career in vaudeville with his father Sammy Davis Sr. and the Will Mastin Trio, which toured nationally, and his film career began in 1933. After military service, Davis returned to the trio and became an overnight sensation following a nightclub performance at Ciro's (in West Hollywood) after the 1951 Academy Awards. With the trio, he became a recording artist. In 1954, at the age of 29, he lost his left eye in a car accident. Several years later, he converted to Judaism, finding commonalities between the oppression experienced by African-American and Jewish communities.
 
He had a starring role on Broadway in Mr. Wonderful with Chita Rivera (1956). In 1960, he appeared in the Rat Pack film Ocean's 11. He returned to the stage in 1964 in a musical adaptation of Clifford Odets' Golden Boy. Davis was nominated for a Tony Award for his performance. The show featured the first interracial kiss on Broadway. In 1966, he had his own TV variety show, titled The Sammy Davis Jr. Show. While Davis's career slowed in the late 1960s, his biggest hit, "The Candy Man", reached the top of the Billboard Hot 100 in June 1972, and he became a star in Las Vegas, earning him the nickname "Mister Show Business".

Davis's popularity helped break the race barrier of the segregated entertainment industry. He did, however, have a complex relationship with the black community and drew criticism after publicly supporting President Richard Nixon in 1972. One day on a golf course with Jack Benny, he was asked what his handicap was. "Handicap?" he asked. "Talk about handicap. I'm a one-eyed Negro who's Jewish." This was to become a signature comment, recounted in his autobiography and in many articles.

After reuniting with Frank Sinatra and Dean Martin in 1987, Davis toured with them and Liza Minnelli internationally, before his death in 1990. He died in debt to the Internal Revenue Service, and his estate was the subject of legal battles after the death of his wife. Davis was awarded the Spingarn Medal by the NAACP and was nominated for a Golden Globe Award and an Emmy Award for his television performances. He was a recipient of the Kennedy Center Honors in 1987, and in 2001, he was posthumously awarded the Grammy Lifetime Achievement Award.

Early life
Davis was born on December 8, 1925, in the Harlem section of Manhattan in New York City, the son of African-American entertainer and stage performer Sammy Davis Sr. (1900–1988) and tap dancer and stage performer Elvera Sanchez (1905–2000). During his lifetime, Davis stated that his mother was Puerto Rican and born in San Juan. However, in the 2003 biography In Black and White, author Wil Haygood wrote that Davis's mother was born in New York City to Cuban parents who were of Afro-Cuban background, and that Davis claimed he was Puerto Rican because he feared anti-Cuban backlash would hurt his record sales. Davis's parents were vaudeville dancers. As an infant, he was reared by his paternal grandmother. When he was three years old, his parents separated. His father, not wanting to lose custody of his son, took him on tour.

Davis learned to dance from his father and his godfather Will Mastin. Davis joined the act as a child, and they became the Will Mastin Trio. Throughout his career, Davis included the Will Mastin Trio in his billing. Mastin and his father shielded him from racism, for example by dismissing race-based snubs as jealousy. However, when Davis served in the United States Army during World War II, he was confronted by strong prejudice. He later said: "Overnight the world looked different. It wasn't one color any more. I could see the protection I'd gotten all my life from my father and Will. I appreciated their loving hope that I'd never need to know about prejudice and hate, but they were wrong. It was as if I'd walked through a swinging door for 18 years, a door which they had always secretly held open." At age seven, Davis played the title role in the film Rufus Jones for President, in which he sang and danced with Ethel Waters. He lived for several years in Boston's South End and reminisced years later about "hoofing and singing" at Izzy Ort's Bar & Grille.

Military service
In 1944, during World War II, Davis was drafted into the U.S. Army at age 18. He was frequently abused by white soldiers from the South and later recounted: "I must have had a knockdown, drag-out fight every two days." His nose was broken numerous times and permanently flattened. At one point he was offered a beer laced with urine.

He was reassigned to the Army's Special Services branch, which put on performances for troops. At one show he found himself performing in front of soldiers who had previously racially abused him. Davis, who earned the American Campaign Medal and World War II Victory Medal, was discharged in 1945 with the rank of private. He later said, "My talent was the weapon, the power, the way for me to fight. It was the one way I might hope to affect a man's thinking."

Career
After his discharge, Davis rejoined the family dance act, which played at clubs around Portland, Oregon. He also recorded blues songs for Capitol Records in 1949 under the pseudonyms Shorty Muggins and Charlie Green.

On March 23, 1951, the Will Mastin Trio appeared at Ciro's as the opening act for headliner Janis Paige. They were to perform for only 20 minutes, but the reaction from the celebrity-filled crowd was so enthusiastic, especially when Davis launched into his impressions, that they performed for nearly an hour, and Paige insisted the order of the show be flipped. Davis began to achieve success on his own and was singled out for praise by critics, releasing several albums.

In 1953, Davis was offered his own television show on ABC, Three for the Road—with the Will Mastin Trio. The network spent $20,000 filming the pilot, which presented African Americans as struggling musicians, not slapstick comedy or the stereotypical mammy roles of the time. The cast included Frances Davis, who was the first black ballerina to perform for the Paris Opera, actresses Ruth Attaway and Jane White, and Frederick O'Neal, who founded the American Negro Theater. The network could not get a sponsor, so the show was dropped.

In 1954, Davis was hired to sing the title song for the Universal Pictures film Six Bridges to Cross. In 1956, he starred in the Broadway musical Mr. Wonderful which was panned by critics but was a commercial success, closing after 383 performances.

In 1958, Davis was hired to crown the winner of the Miss Cavalcade of Jazz beauty contest for the famed fourteenth Cavalcade of Jazz concert produced by Leon Hefflin Sr., held at the Shrine Auditorium on August 3. The other headliners were Little Willie John, Sam Cooke, Ernie Freeman, and Bo Rhambo. The event featured the top four prominent disc jockeys of Los Angeles.

In 1959, Davis became a member of the Rat Pack, led by his friend Frank Sinatra, which included fellow performers Dean Martin, Joey Bishop, and Peter Lawford, a brother-in-law of John F. Kennedy. Initially, Sinatra called the gathering "the Clan", but Davis voiced his opposition, saying that it reminded people of the Ku Klux Klan. Sinatra renamed the group "the Summit". One long night of poker that went on into the early morning saw the men drunken and disheveled. As Angie Dickinson approached the group, she said, "You all look like a pack of rats." The nickname caught on, and they were then called the Rat Pack, the name of the earlier group led by Humphrey Bogart and his wife, Lauren Bacall, who originally made the remark about the "pack of rats" they associated with.

The group around Sinatra made several movies together, including Ocean's 11 (1960), Sergeants 3 (1962), and Robin and the 7 Hoods (1964), and they performed onstage together in Las Vegas. In 1964, Davis was the first African American to sing at the Copacabana night club in New York.

Davis was a headliner at The Frontier Casino in Las Vegas, but owing to Jim Crow practices in Las Vegas, he was required (as were all black performers in the 1950s) to lodge in a rooming house on the west side of the city instead of in the hotels as his white colleagues did. No dressing rooms were provided for black performers, and they had to wait outside by the swimming pool between acts. Davis and other black artists could entertain but could not stay at the hotels where they performed, gamble in the casinos, or dine or drink in the hotel restaurants and bars. Davis later refused to work at places that practiced racial segregation.

Canada provided opportunities for performers like Davis unable to break the color barrier in U.S. broadcast television, and in 1959 he starred in his own TV special, Sammy's Parade, on the Canadian network CBC. It was a breakthrough event for the performer, as in the United States in the 1950s corporate sponsors largely controlled the screen: "Black people [were] not portrayed very well on television, if at all," according to Jason King of the Clive Davis Institute of Recorded Music.

In 1964, Davis was starring in Golden Boy at night and shooting his own New York-based afternoon talk show during the day. When he could get a day off from the theater, he recorded songs in the studio, performed at charity events in Chicago, Miami, or Las Vegas, or appeared on television variety specials in Los Angeles. Davis felt he was cheating his family of his company, but he said he was incapable of standing still.

Although he was still popular in Las Vegas, he saw his musical career decline by the late 1960s. He had a No. 11 hit (No. 1 on the Easy Listening singles chart) with "I've Gotta Be Me" in 1969. He signed with Motown to update his sound and appeal to young people. His deal to have his own label with the company fell through. He had an unexpected No. 1 hit with "The Candy Man" with MGM Records in 1972. He did not particularly care for the song and was chagrined that he had become known for it, but Davis made the most of his opportunity and revitalized his career.

Although he enjoyed no more Top 40 hits, he did enjoy popularity with his 1976 performance of the theme song from the Baretta television series, "Baretta's Theme (Keep Your Eye on the Sparrow)" (1975–1978), which was released as a single (20th Century Records). He appeared on numerous television shows since the 1950s, like The Rifleman, where he showcased his gunspinning skills. In ABC's 1960s hit medical drama Ben Casey, Davis addressed the loss of an eye. When Westerns waned in popularity, he accepted parts in Emmy winning sitcoms like 1960s I Dream of Jeannie or in politically charged satires, including the 1973 episode of All in the Family, in which Davis famously kisses Archie Bunker (Carroll O'Connor) on the cheek, Davis' own idea. He ironically played to comic effect both himself and a Sammy Davis impersonator in the 1970s PI drama Charlie's Angels, along with his wife, Altovise Davis.

On December 11, 1967, NBC broadcast a musical-variety special featuring Nancy Sinatra, the daughter of Frank Sinatra, titled Movin' with Nancy. In addition to the Emmy Award-winning musical performances, the show is notable for Nancy Sinatra and Davis greeting each other with a kiss, one of the first black-white kisses in US television.

Davis had a friendship with Elvis Presley in the late 1960s, as they both were top-draw acts in Las Vegas at the same time. Davis was in many ways just as reclusive during his hotel gigs as Elvis was, holding parties mainly in his penthouse suite that Elvis occasionally attended. Davis sang a version of Presley's song "In the Ghetto" and made a cameo appearance in Presley's 1970 concert film Elvis: That's the Way It Is. One year later, he made a cameo appearance in the James Bond film Diamonds Are Forever, but the scene was cut. In Japan, Davis appeared in television commercials for coffee and Suntory Whiskey. In the United States he joined Sinatra and Martin in a radio commercial for a Chicago car dealership.

On May 27–28, 1973, Davis hosted (with Monty Hall) the first annual 20-hour Highway Safety Foundation telethon. Guests included Muhammad Ali, Paul Anka, Jack Barry, Dr. Joyce Brothers, Ray Charles, Dick Clark, Roy Clark, Howard Cosell, Ossie Davis, Ruby Dee, Joe Franklin, Cliff Gorman, Richie Havens, Danny Kaye, Jerry Lewis, Hal Linden, Rich Little, Butterfly McQueen, Minnie Pearl, Boots Randolph, Tex Ritter, Phil Rizzuto, The Rockettes, Nipsey Russell, Sally Struthers, Mel Tillis, Ben Vereen, and Lawrence Welk. It was a financial disaster. The total amount of pledges was $1.2 million. Actual pledges received were $525,000.

Davis was a huge fan of daytime television, particularly the soap operas produced by the American Broadcasting Company. He made a cameo appearance on General Hospital and had a recurring role as Chip Warren on One Life to Live, for which he received a 1980 Daytime Emmy Award nomination. He was also a game show fan, appearing on Family Feud in 1979 and Tattletales with his wife Altovise in the 1970s.

After his bout with cirrhosis due to years of drinking, Davis announced his sponsorship of the Sammy Davis Jr. National Liver Institute in Newark, New Jersey in 1985. In 1988, Davis was billed to tour with Frank Sinatra and Dean Martin, but Sinatra and Martin had a falling out. Liza Minnelli replaced Martin on the tour dubbed as ''The Ultimate Event.'' During the tour in 1989, Davis was diagnosed with throat cancer; his treatments prevented him from performing.

Personal life

Accident and conversion

Davis nearly died in an automobile accident on November 19, 1954, in San Bernardino, California, as he was making a return trip from Las Vegas to Los Angeles. During the previous year, he had started a friendship with comedian and host Eddie Cantor, who had given him a mezuzah. Instead of putting it by his door as a traditional blessing, Davis wore it around his neck for good luck. The only time he forgot it was the night of the accident. The accident occurred at a fork in U.S. Route 66 at Cajon Boulevard and Kendall Drive, when a driver, who missed turning at the fork, backed up her car in Davis's lane and he drove into her car. Sammy consequently lost his left eye to the bullet-shaped horn button (a standard feature in 1954 and 1955 Cadillacs). His friend, actor Jeff Chandler, said he would give one of his own eyes to keep Davis from total blindness. He wore an eye patch for at least six months following the accident. The singer was featured with the patch on the cover of his debut album and appeared on What's My Line? wearing the patch. Later, Davis was fitted for a glass eye, which he wore for the rest of his life.

In the hospital, Eddie Cantor described to Sammy the similarities between Jewish and Black cultures. Davis, born to a Catholic mother and Baptist father, began studying Jewish history, converting to Judaism several years later in 1961. One passage from his readings (from the book A History of the Jews by Abram L. Sachar), describing the endurance of the Jewish people, interested him in particular: "The Jews would not die. Three millennia of prophetic teaching had given them an unwavering spirit of resignation and had created in them a will to live which no disaster could crush." The accident marked a turning point in Davis's career, taking him from a well-known entertainer to a national celebrity.

Relationships and marriages 

In 1957, Davis was involved with actress Kim Novak, who was under contract with Columbia Pictures. Because Novak was white, Harry Cohn, the president of Columbia, gave in to his worries that backlash against the relationship could hurt the studio. There are several accounts of what happened, but they agree that Davis was threatened by organized crime figures close to Cohn. According to one account, Cohn called racketeer John Roselli, who was told to inform Davis that he must stop seeing Novak. To try to scare Davis, Roselli had him kidnapped for a few hours. Another account relates that the threat was conveyed to Davis's father by mobster Mickey Cohen. Davis was threatened with the loss of his other eye or a broken leg if he did not marry a black woman within two days. Davis sought the protection of Chicago mobster Sam Giancana, who said that he could protect him in Chicago and Las Vegas but not California.

Davis briefly married black dancer Loray White in 1958 to protect himself from mob violence; Davis had previously dated White, who was 23 and twice divorced and had a six-year-old child. He paid her a lump sum – $10,000 or $25,000 – to engage in a marriage on the condition that it would be dissolved before the end of the year. Davis became inebriated at the wedding and attempted to strangle White en route to their wedding suite. Checking on him later, Davis's personal assistant Arthur Silber Jr. found Davis with a gun to his head. Davis despairingly said to Silber, "Why won't they let me live my life?" The couple never lived together and commenced divorce proceedings in September 1958. The divorce was granted in April 1959.

In 1959, he had  “a short, stormy, exciting relationship” with Nichelle Nichols.

In 1960, there was another racially charged public controversy when Davis married white, Swedish-born actress May Britt in a ceremony officiated by Rabbi William M. Kramer at Temple Israel of Hollywood. While interracial marriage had been legal in California since 1948, anti-miscegenation laws in the U.S. still stood in 23 states, and a 1958 opinion poll had found that only four percent of Americans supported marriage between black and white spouses. During 1964–66, Davis received racist hate mail while starring in the Broadway adaptation of Golden Boy, in which his character is in a relationship with a white woman, paralleling his own interracial relationship. At the time Davis appeared in the musical, although New York had no laws against it, debate about interracial marriage was still ongoing in America as Loving v. Virginia was being fought. It was only in 1967, after the musical finished, that anti-miscegenation laws in all states were ruled unconstitutional by the U.S. Supreme Court.

Davis's daughter Tracey Davis (July 5, 1961 – November 2, 2020) revealed in a 2014 book that the marriage to Britt also resulted in President Kennedy refusing to allow Davis to perform at his inauguration. The snub was confirmed by director Sam Pollard, who revealed in a 2017 American Masters documentary that Davis's invitation to perform at his inauguration was abruptly cancelled on the night of his inaugural party.

In addition to Tracey, Davis and Britt adopted two sons, Mark and Jeff. Davis performed almost continuously and spent little time with his wife. They divorced in 1968 after Davis admitted to having had an affair with singer Lola Falana. After his marriage imploded, Davis turned to alcohol and "found solace in drugs, particularly cocaine and amyl nitrite, and experimented briefly with Satanism and pornography".

In 1968, Davis started dating Altovise Gore, a dancer in Golden Boy. They were married on May 11, 1970, by Reverend Jesse Jackson and adopted a son, Manny, in 1989. Davis and Gore remained married until his death in 1990.

Hobbies 
Davis was an avid photographer who enjoyed shooting pictures of family and acquaintances. His body of work was detailed in a 2007 book by Burt Boyar titled Photo by Sammy Davis, Jr. "Jerry [Lewis] gave me my first important camera, my first 35 millimeter, during the Ciro's period, early '50s", Boyar quotes Davis as saying "And he hooked me". Davis used a medium format camera later on to capture images. Boyar reports that Davis had said, "Nobody interrupts a man taking a picture to ask... 'What's that nigger doin' here?'" His catalog includes rare photos of his father dancing onstage as part of the Will Mastin Trio and intimate snapshots of close friends Jerry Lewis, Dean Martin, Frank Sinatra, James Dean, Nat "King" Cole, and Marilyn Monroe. His political affiliations also were represented, in his images of Robert Kennedy, Jackie Kennedy, and Martin Luther King Jr. His most revealing work comes in photographs of wife May Britt and their three children, Tracey, Jeff and Mark.

Davis was an enthusiastic shooter and gun owner. He participated in fast-draw competitions. Johnny Cash recalled that Davis was said to be capable of drawing and firing a Colt Single Action Army revolver in less than a quarter of a second. Davis was skilled at fast and fancy gunspinning and appeared on television variety shows showing off this skill. He also demonstrated gunspinning to Mark on The Rifleman in "Two Ounces of Tin". He appeared in western films and as a guest star on several television westerns.

Political beliefs

Davis was a registered Democrat and supported John F. Kennedy's 1960 election campaign as well as Robert F. Kennedy's 1968 campaign. He went on to become a close friend of President Richard Nixon (a Republican) and publicly endorsed him at the 1972 Republican National Convention. Davis also made a USO tour to South Vietnam at Nixon's request.

In February 1972, during the later stages of the Vietnam War, Davis went to Vietnam to observe military drug abuse rehabilitation programs and talk to and entertain the troops. He did this as a representative from President Nixon's Special Action Office For Drug Abuse Prevention. He performed shows for up to 15,000 troops; after one two-hour performance he reportedly said, "I've never been so tired and felt so good in my life." The U.S. Army made a documentary about Davis's time in Vietnam performing for troops on behalf of Nixon's drug treatment program.

Nixon invited Davis and his wife, Altovise, to sleep in the White House in 1973, the first time African Americans were invited to do so. The Davises spent the night in the Lincoln Bedroom. Davis later said he regretted supporting Nixon, accusing him of making promises on civil rights that he did not keep. Davis was a longtime donor to the Reverend Jesse Jackson's Operation PUSH organization and later supported Jackson's 1984 campaign for president.

Illness and death

In August 1989, Davis began to develop symptoms of cancer - a tickle in his throat and an inability to taste food. Doctors found a malignant tumor in Davis' throat. He was a heavy smoker and had often smoked four packs of cigarettes a day as an adult. When told that surgery (laryngectomy) offered him the best chance of survival (as believed by oncologists at the time, but no longer the case), Davis replied he would rather keep his voice than have a part of his throat removed; he was treated with definitive radiation therapy. His larynx was later removed when his cancer recurred. He was released from the hospital on March 13, 1990.

Davis died of complications from throat cancer two months later at his home in Beverly Hills, California, on May 16, 1990, at age 64. He was buried at Forest Lawn Memorial Park in Glendale, California. On May 18, 1990, two days after his death, the neon lights of the Las Vegas Strip were darkened for ten minutes as a tribute.

Estate 
Davis left the bulk of his estate, estimated at $4,000,000 (U.S.), to his widow, Altovise Davis, but he owed the IRS $5,200,000 which, after interest and penalties, had increased to over $7,000,000. Altovise became liable for his debt because she had co-signed his tax returns. She was forced to auction his personal possessions and real estate. Some of his friends in the industry, including Quincy Jones, Joey Bishop, Ed Asner, Jayne Meadows, and Steve Allen, participated in a fundraising concert at the Sands Hotel in Las Vegas. Altovise and the IRS reached a settlement in 1997. After she died in 2009, their son Manny was named executor of the estate and majority-rights holder of his intellectual property.

Legacy

Portrayals
In an episode of Charlie's Angels, Davis had a dual role, playing both himself and a Sammy Davis Jr. impersonator who is kidnapped by mistake (in a comic relief scene, the impersonator beats up a candy machine which does not give him his candy, a spoof of Davis's song "The Candy Man").
Comedian Jim Carrey has portrayed Davis on stage, in the 1983 film Copper Mountain, and in a stand-up routine.
On Saturday Night Live, Davis has been portrayed by Garrett Morris, Eddie Murphy, Billy Crystal and Tim Meadows.
Davis was portrayed on the popular sketch comedy show In Living Color by Tommy Davidson, notably a parody of the film Ghost, in which the ghost of Davis enlists the help of Whoopi Goldberg to communicate with his wife.
David Raynr portrayed Davis in the 1992 miniseries Sinatra, a television film about the life of Frank Sinatra.
In the comedy film Wayne's World 2 (1993), Tim Meadows portrays Davis in the dream sequence with Michael A. Nickles as Jim Morrison.
In the sitcom Malcolm & Eddie (1996), Eddie Sherman (played by comedian Eddie Griffin) impersonates Davis in the episode "Sh-Boing-Boing" to help his partner Malcolm McGee (played by Malcolm-Jamal Warner) reconcile his grandparents' relationship.
Davis was portrayed by Don Cheadle in the HBO film The Rat Pack, a 1998 television film about the group of entertainers. Cheadle won a Golden Globe Award for his performance.
He was portrayed by Paul Sharma in the 2003 West End production Rat Pack Confidential.
Davis was portrayed in 2008 by Keith Powell in an episode of 30 Rock titled "Subway Hero".
In September 2009, the musical Sammy: Once in a Lifetime premiered at the Old Globe Theatre in San Diego with a book, music, and lyrics by Leslie Bricusse, and additional songs by Bricusse and Anthony Newley. The title role was played by Tony Award nominee Obba Babatundé.
Comedian Billy Crystal has portrayed Davis on Saturday Night Live, in his stand-up routines, and at the 2012 Oscars.
Actor Phaldut Sharma created the comedy web-series I Gotta Be Me (2015), following a frustrated soap star as he performs as Sammy in a Rat Pack tribute show.
In January 2017, Davis's estate joined a production team led by Lionel Richie, Lorenzo di Bonaventura, and Mike Menchel to make a movie based on Davis's life and show-biz career.

Honors and awards
Shortly before his death in 1990, ABC aired the TV special Sammy Davis, Jr. 60th Anniversary Celebration, produced by George Schlatter. An all-star cast, including Frank Sinatra, Dean Martin, Michael Jackson, Whitney Houston, Eddie Murphy, Diahann Carroll, Clint Eastwood, and Ella Fitzgerald, paid tribute to Davis. The show was nominated for six Primetime Emmy Awards, winning Outstanding Variety, Music or Comedy.

Grammy Awards

Emmy Awards

Other honors

Discography

Filmography

 Rufus Jones for President (1933) – Rufus Jones
 Seasoned Greetings (1933) – Henry Johnson – Store Customer 
 Sweet and Low (1947) – Member, Will Maston Trio 
 Meet Me in Las Vegas (1956) – Sammy Davis Jr. (voice, uncredited)
 Anna Lucasta (1958) – Danny Johnson
 Porgy and Bess (1959) – Sportin' Life
 Ocean's 11 (1960) – Josh Howard
 Pepe (1960) – Sammy Davis Jr.
 Sergeants 3 (1962) – Jonah Williams
 Convicts 4 (1962) – Wino
  (1963) – Street Singer
 Johnny Cool (1963) – Educated
 Robin and the 7 Hoods (1964) – Will
 Nightmare in the Sun (1965) – Truck driver
 The Second Best Secret Agent in the Whole Wide World (1965, title song) – Singer behind opening credits (uncredited)
 A Man Called Adam (1966) – Adam Johnson
 Alice in Wonderland (or What's a Nice Kid Like You Doing in a Place Like This?) (1966) - Cheshire Cat
 Salt and Pepper (1968) – Charles Salt
 The Fall (1969)
 The Pigeon (1969) - Larry Miller
 Sweet Charity (1969) – Big Daddy
 One More Time (1970) – Charles Salt
 Elvis: That's the Way It Is (1970) 
 The Trackers (1971) – TV movie with Ernest Borgnine
 Diamonds Are Forever (1971) – Casino Punter (deleted scene)
 Save the Children (1973)
 Poor Devil (1973; unsold pilot of a TV series)
 Gone with the West, also known outside the U.S. as Little Moon and Jud McGraw (1975) – Kid Dandy
 Madeleine (1977) – Spud The Scarecrow (singing voice)
 Sammy Stops the World (1978) – Littlechap
 The Cannonball Run (1981) – Morris Fenderbaum
 Heidi's Song (1982) – Head Ratte (voice)
 Cracking Up (1983)
 Broadway Danny Rose (1984) – Thanksgiving Parade's Grand Marshall (uncredited)
 Cannonball Run II (1984) – Morris Fenderbaum
 Alice in Wonderland (1985) – The Caterpillar / Father William
 That's Dancing! (1985)
 Knights of the City (1986)
 The Perils of P.K. (1986)
 Moon over Parador (1988)
 Tap (1989) – Little Mo
 The Kid Who Loved Christmas (1990) – Sideman (final film role)

Stage
 Mr. Wonderful (1957), musical
 Golden Boy (1964), musical – Tony Nomination for Best Actor in a Musical
 Sammy (1974), special performance featuring Davis with the Nicholas Brothers
 Stop the World – I Want to Get Off (1978) musical revival

Television

 What's My Line? – "Sammy Davis Jr." (1955) 
 General Electric Theater – "The Patsy" (1960) Season 8 Episode 21
 Lawman – episode Blue Boss and Willie Shay" (1961)
 The Dick Powell Show – episode "The Legend" (1962)
 Hennesey – episode "Tight Quarters" (1962)
 The Rifleman – 2 episodes "Two Ounces of Tin (#4.21)" (February 19, 1962) and "The Most Amazing Man (#5.9)" (November 27, 1962)
 77 Sunset Strip – episode "The Gang's All Here" (1962)
 Ben Casey – episode "Allie" (1963)
 The Patty Duke Show – episode "Will the Real Sammy Davis Please Hang Up?" (1965)
 The Sammy Davis Jr. Show – Host (January 7, 1966)
 Alice In Wonderland or What's a Nice Kid Like You Doing in a Place Like This? (March 30, 1966)
 The Wild Wild West – episode "The Night of the Returning Dead" (October 14, 1966)
 Batman – "The Clock King's Crazy Crimes" (1966)
 I Dream of Jeannie – episode "The Greatest Entertainer in the World" (1967)
 Rowan & Martin's Laugh-In – Here Comes The Judge skit (1968–70, 1971, 1973)
 The Mod Squad – three episodes: "Keep the Faith Baby" (1969), "Survival House" (1970), and "The Song of Willie" (1970)
 The Beverly Hillbillies – episode Manhattan Hillbillies (1969)
 The Name of the Game – episode "I Love You, Billy Baker" (1970)
 Here's Lucy (1970)
 The Courtship of Eddie's Father – episode "A Little Help From My Friend" (1972)
 All in the Family – episode "Sammy's Visit" (1972)
 Chico and the Man – episode "Sammy Stops In" (1975)
 The Carol Burnett Show (1975)
 Sammy & Company – host/performer (1975–1977)
 Charlie's Angels – episode "Sammy Davis, Jr. Kidnap Caper" (1977)
 Sanford – episodes "Dinner and George's" (cameo) and "The Benefit" (1980)
 Archie Bunker's Place – episode "The Return of Sammy" (1980)
 General Hospital – episode Benefit for Sports Center (1982)
 General Hospital – Eddie Phillips (father to Bryan Phillips) (1983)
 Channel Seven Perth's Telethon (1983)
 The Jeffersons – episode "What Makes Sammy Run?" (1984)
 Fantasy Island – episode "Mr. Bojangles and the Dancer/Deuces are Wild" (1984)
 Gimme a Break! – episode "The Lookalike" (1985)
 Alice in Wonderland (1985 film)
 Hunter – episode "Ring of Honor" (1989)
 The Cosby Show – episode "No Way, Baby" (1989)
 Sammy Davis, Jr. 60th Anniversary Celebration (1990) – 2 hour all star TV special

See also

 History of the Jews in the African diaspora
 List of Hispanic and Latino Americans

References

Further reading

Autobiographies
 Yes, I Can (with Burt and Jane Boyar) (1965), 
 Why Me? (with Burt and Jane Boyar) (1989), 
 Sammy (with Burt and Jane Boyar) (2000), ; consolidates the two previous books and includes additional material
 Hollywood in a Suitcase (1980),

Biographies

Birkbeck, Matt (2008), Deconstructing Sammy: Music, Money, Madness, and the Mob. Amistad. 
Silber, Arthur Jr. (2003), "Sammy Davis Jr: Me and My Shadow, Samart Enterprises,

Other
 Photo by Sammy Davis, Jr. (Burt Boyar) (2007)

External links

 
 
 
 FBI Records: The Vault – Sammy Davis Jr. at fbi.gov
 Discography of Sammy Davis Jr.'s Recording Career
 "Sammy Davis Jr. Dies at 64; Top Showman Broke Barriers", The New York Times, May 17, 1990.
 Davis Jr. talks to draft dodgers in Canada, CBC Archives
 Archival Television Audio on Sammy Davis Jr.
 BBC Radio 4 programme on Sammy Davis Jr.
 
 Image of Sammy Davis Jr. taking a photograph of his wife May Britt and newly adopted son Jeff on steps of Los Angeles County Courthouse, California, 1965. Los Angeles Times Photographic Archive (Collection 1429). UCLA Library Special Collections, Charles E. Young Research Library, University of California, Los Angeles.
 Sammy Davis Jr. recordings at the Discography of American Historical Recordings.

 
Sammy Davis Jr
1925 births
1990 deaths
20th-century American comedians
20th-century American Jews
20th-century American male actors
20th-century American memoirists
20th-century American singers
Activists for African-American civil rights
Activists from New York City
Actors with disabilities
African-American activists
African-American film producers
African-American jazz musicians
African-American jazz pianists
African-American Jews
African-American male actors
African-American male child actors
African-American male comedians
African-American male dancers
African-American male singers
African-American memoirists
African-American television directors
African-American television talk show hosts
American entertainers of Cuban descent
American film producers
American impressionists (entertainers)
American jazz singers
American male child actors
American male comedians
American male dancers
American male film actors
American male jazz musicians
American male musical theatre actors
American male pianists
American male singers
American male soap opera actors
American male stage actors
American male television actors
American musicians of Cuban descent
American people with disabilities
American tap dancers
American television directors
American television talk show hosts
Burials at Forest Lawn Memorial Park (Glendale)
California Democrats
Charly Records artists
Comedians from California
Comedians from Massachusetts
Comedians from New York City
Converts to Judaism
Converts to Judaism from Christianity
Converts to Reform Judaism
Dancers from New York (state)
Decca Records artists
Deaths from cancer in California
Deaths from esophageal cancer
Grammy Lifetime Achievement Award winners
Hispanic and Latino American male actors
Hispanic and Latino American musicians
Jazz musicians from California
Jazz musicians from Massachusetts
Jazz musicians from New York (state)
Jewish American male actors
Jewish American male comedians
Jewish American musicians
Jewish jazz musicians
Jewish singers
Kennedy Center honorees
Las Vegas shows
Male actors from Boston
Male actors from New York City
Military personnel from New York City
Musicians from Boston
People from Beverly Hills, California
People from Harlem
People from South End, Boston
Reprise Records artists
Roulette Records artists
 
Singers from California
Singers from Massachusetts
Singers from New York City
Spingarn Medal winners
Traditional pop music singers
United States Army personnel of World War II
United States Army soldiers
United Service Organizations entertainers
Vaudeville performers